Mel Raido (born 1977) is a Jamaican-born English actor. Raido moved to London at three years old. After taking elocution lessons, he started to become hooked by the acting bug at school and studied at the Webber Douglas Academy of Dramatic Art.

Early life and training
Raido, whose given name is Menelaus Joaquin, was born in Jamaica and, at age three, relocated to London with his family. He studied at Webber Douglas Academy of Dramatic Art between 1996 and 1999.

Career
He subsequently worked with the avant-garde theatre company Mabou Mines before starting his TV and film career. Mel made his breakthrough in the play Corpus Christi, where he played Jesus, at the Edinburgh Festival in 1999. He then went on to appear in numerous plays all over the country and in television dramas such as Midsomer Murders, Red Cap and The Vice.

Theatre
He has appeared numerous theatres in London including the Finborough Theatre (I Witness by Joshua Sobol in 2007), the Pleasance Theatre (Corpus Christi by Terrence McNally in 1999, and Office Games by Trevor Baxter in 2003), Southwark Playhouse (Eskimo Sisters by Laline Paull in 2002), and Royal Court Theatre (Fireface by Marius von Mayenburg in 2000).

Filmography

References

External links
 

1977 births
Male actors from London
British people of Greek descent
British people of Spanish descent
Living people